Javier Rincon (born 15 June 1968) is a Colombian wrestler. He competed in the men's freestyle 62 kg at the 1988 Summer Olympics.

References

External links
 

1968 births
Living people
Colombian male sport wrestlers
Olympic wrestlers of Colombia
Wrestlers at the 1988 Summer Olympics
Place of birth missing (living people)